Beaky and the Egg Snatchers is a Joust clone developed for the ZX Spectrum by Bob Hamilton and published by Fantasy Software. A Commodore 64 version was published the same year.

Gameplay 

The player takes on the role of the last of the Andromdean Condors who must prevent their species from becoming extinct by rescuing them from the egg snatchers. The game plays similarly to Jetpack and Joust.

Reception
Beaky and the Egg Snatchers was positively received, including two out of three approvals from Your Spectrum reviewers. It was review-score rated 31/40 by Computer & Video Games and 34/50 by Personal Computer Games.

References

External links
Beaky and the Egg Snatchers at World of Spectrum
Beaky and the Egg Snatchers at gamebase 64

1984 video games
Commodore 64 games
Single-player video games
Video games developed in the United Kingdom
Video games featuring female protagonists
ZX Spectrum games